The Emerald of Artatama (also known as La Muchacha del Nilo and The Girl of the Nile) is a 1969 adventure film directed by José María Elorrieta and distributed by Troma Entertainment.

The film stars Rory Calhoun as a con man searching after the Tomb of Artatama, rumoured to be home of a legendary emerald.

In a 1986 VHS release by Applause Production Inc. it was mistakenly titled The Emerald of Aratama.

Cast

References

External links

1969 films
1969 adventure films
Spanish adventure films
Spanish independent films
Treasure hunt films
Troma Entertainment films
Films shot in Almería
Films produced by Sidney W. Pink
Films directed by José María Elorrieta
1969 independent films